This is a list of mosques in Israel.

Geographic distribution

Jerusalem 
Masjid Al Aqsa - Old City
Al-Khanqah al-Salahiyya Mosque - Old City
Marwani Mosque - Old City
Mosque of Omar - Old City
Abdeen Mosque - Wadi al-Joz
Sultan Ibrahim Ibn Adham Mosque - Beit Hanina

North

el-Jazzar Mosque - Acre 
Mahmood Mosque - Haifa
al-Muallaq Mosque - Acre
White Mosque - Nazareth
Makam al-Nabi Sain Mosque - Nazareth
 - Shefa-'Amr

Central

Al-Bahr Mosque - Tel Aviv
Hassan Bek Mosque - Tel Aviv
Mahmoudiya Mosque - Tel Aviv
Siksik Mosque - Tel Aviv
Sidna Ali Mosque - Herzliya
White Mosque - Ramla
Mosque of Salahaddin al-Ayyubi - Tayibe
Mosque of Ali ibn Abi Talib - Tayibe

See also
 Islam in Israel
 Lists of mosques

References

External links
Directory of Mosques in Israel Archnet Digital Library.
Directory of Mosques in Jerusalem Archnet Digital Library.

Israel
 
Mosques